Cymindis championi is a species of ground beetle in the subfamily Harpalinae. It was described by Andrewes in 1928.

References

championi
Beetles described in 1928